Events in the year 1898 in Belgium.

Incumbents
Monarch: Leopold II
Prime Minister: Paul de Smet de Naeyer

Events

18 April - Coremans-De Vriendt law gives Dutch and French equal legal status in Belgian public life.
22 May - Belgian general election, 1898
 5 June – Provincial elections
 23 June – Opening of the Château royal d'Ardenne as a luxury hotel run by the Compagnie Internationale des Grands Hotels.
 13–17 July – Eleventh International Eucharistic Congress held in Brussels.
 27 July – Anglo-Belgian Treaty of Commerce and Navigation comes to an end, due to notification of the United Kingdom's withdrawal a year earlier.

Publications
 Léon Bloy, Mendiant ingrat (Brussels, Edmond Deman)
 J. Nyssens-Hart, The Outer Port and the Inner Port of Bruges (Brussels, A> Lesigne)
 Max Rooses (ed.), Het schildersboek: Nederlandsche schilders der negentiende eeuw, vol. 1, vol. 2.
 Emile Vandervelde, Le Socialisme en Belgique
 Émile Verhaeren, Les aubes (Brussels, Edmond Deman)

Art and architecture

Paintings
 Eugène Laermans, The Drunkard
Buildings
 Victor Horta, Hôtel Solvay

Births
8 February - André Fierens, footballer (d. 1972)
5 March – Lucien Leboutte, air chief (d. 1988)
17 March - Raymond Decorte, cyclist (d. 1972)

Deaths
12 January – Jean Jules Linden (born 1817), botanist
14 January – Polydore de Keyser (born 1832), Lord Mayor of London
25 January – François Roffiaen (born 1820), painter
22 March – Pieter De Rudder (born 1822), labourer
25 April – Prosper de Haulleville (born 1830), newspaperman
1 May – Alphonse Wauters (born 1817), archivist
3 June – Emma De Vigne (born 1850), painter
9 June – Joseph Jaquet (born 1822), sculptor
13 July – Émile Banning (born 1836), government adviser
23 August – Félicien Rops (born 1833), illustrator
11 September – Adolphe Samuel (born 1824), composer
30 September – Léon Mignon (born 1847), sculptor
25 December – Georges Rodenbach (born 1855), author

References

 
1890s in Belgium